Pox may refer to:

Diseases

Poxviridae

Buffalopox, a disease of buffaloes
Camelpox, a disease of camels
Canarypox, a disease of wild and captive birds
Chickenpox, a highly contagious illness caused by a primary infection with varicella zoster virus (VZV)
Cowpox, a rodent disease that can infect cattle, and also transmissible to humans; used for vaccination against smallpox
Dogpox, an infection of canines
Fowlpox, an infectious disease of poultry
Goatpox, an infectious disease of goats
Horsepox, an infectious disease of horses
Monkeypox, an infectious rodent disease than can infect primates
Mousepox, an iatrogenic infectious disease of laboratory mice
Myxomatosis, "wild rabbitpox", an infectious disease of wild rabbits
Pigeonpox, an infectious disease of pigeons
Plumpox, the most devastating viral disease of stone fruit from the genus “Prunus”
Quokkapox a disease caused by the Quokkapox virus, also called marsupialpox.
Rabbitpox, an iatrogenic infectious disease of laboratory rabbits
Rickettsialpox, a rickettsial disease spread by mites
Sealpox, a skin condition caused by a parapoxvirus
Sheeppox, an infectious disease of sheep
Smallpox, an eradicated infectious disease unique to humans, caused by either of two virus variants, Variola major and Variola minor
Hemorrhagic smallpox, Blackpox a severe manifestation of smallpox caused by bleeding under the skin
Squirrelpox, an infectious disease of squirrel
Swinepox, an infectious disease of swine
Syphilis, also known as grande verole, the “greatpox”, a sexually transmitted disease caused by the spirochetal bacteria Treponema pallidum pallidum
Turkeypox, a disease of turkeys
Whitepox disease, a coral disease

Arts, entertainment, and media

Games
P-O-X, a 2001 handheld electronic game
Pox: Save the People, a 2010 board game and mobile game
PoxNora, a 2006 multiplayer online game that combines a collectible card game with a turn-based strategy game in a fantasy setting

Other uses in arts, entertainment, and media
Orthopox 13, a character in the video game series Destroy All Humans!
The P.O.X., a German band
House of X and Powers of X (HOX/POX)
"Pox", a song by Xiu Xiu from La Forêt

Food and drink
Pox (drink), a ceremonial drink common among the Maya, especially those in Chamula
Candy Buttons, also called "pox", small rounded pegs of candy that are attached to a strip of paper
Premature oxidation of wine

Other uses
Istiblennius pox, a kind of fish found in the Indian Ocean
Plain Old XML, basic XML, a computer data representation format
Partial oxidation, or POX, a chemical reaction
Pontoise – Cormeilles Aerodrome, an airport in France with IATA code POX
President's Overseas XV, a 1971 squad of the English Rugby Football Union

See also
Plague (disambiguation), another general term for disease